Vision rehabilitation (often called vision rehab) is a term for a medical rehabilitation to improve vision or low vision. In other words, it is the process of restoring functional ability and improving quality of life and independence in an individual who has lost visual function through illness or injury. Most visual rehabilitation services are focused on low vision, which is a visual impairment that cannot be fully corrected by regular eyeglasses, contact lenses, medication, or surgery. Low vision interferes with the ability to perform everyday activities. Visual impairment is caused by factors including brain damage, vision loss, and others. Of the vision rehabilitation techniques available, most center on neurological and physical approaches.

Definition 
Rehabilitation (literally, the act of making able again) helps patients achieve physical, social, emotional, spiritual independence and quality of life. Rehabilitation does not undo or reverse the cause of damage; it seeks to promote function and independence through adaptation. Individuals can seek rehabilitation in different domains, such as motor rehabilitation after a stroke or physical rehabilitation after a car accident. Low vision can be caused by many diseases.

Clinical studies and treatments

Neurological approach
There are many treatments and therapies to slow degradation of vision loss or improve the vision using neurological approaches. Studies have found that low vision can be restored to good vision. In some cases, vision cannot be restored to normal levels but progressive visual loss can be stopped through interventions.

Chemical treatments 
In general, chemical treatments are designed to slow the process of vision loss. Some research is done with neuroprotective treatment that will slow the progression of vision loss. Despite other approaches existing, neuroprotective treatments seem to be most common among all chemical treatments.

Gene therapy
Gene therapy uses DNA as a delivery system to treat visual impairments. In this approach, DNA is modified through a viral vector, and then cells related to vision cease translating faulty proteins. Gene therapy seems to be the most prominent field that might be able to restore vision through therapy. However, research indicates gene therapy may worsen symptoms, cause them to last longer or lead to further complications.

Physical approach
For physical approaches to vision rehabilitation, most of the training is focused on ways to make environments easier to deal with for those with low vision. Occupational therapy is commonly suggested for these patients. Also, there are devices that help patients achieve higher standards of living. These include video magnifiers, peripheral prism glasses, transcranial direct current stimulation (tDCS), closed-circuit television (CCTV), RFID devices, electronic badges with emergency alert systems, virtual sound systems, and smart wheelchairs.

Mobility training
Mobility training improves the ability for patients with visual impairment to live independently by training patients to become more mobile. For low vision patients, there are multiple mobility training methods and devices available including the 3D sound virtual reality system, talking braille, and RFID floors.

The 3D sound virtual reality system transforms sounds into locations and maps the environment. This system alerts patients to avoid possible dangers. The talking braille is a device that helps low vision patients to read braille by detecting light and transmitting this information through Bluetooth technology. RFID floors are GPS-like navigation systems which help patients to detect building interiors, which ultimately allow them to detour around obstacles.

Home skills training
Home skills training allows patients to improve communication skills, self-care skills, cognitive skills, socialization skills, vocational training, psychological testing, and education. One study indicates that multicomponent group interventions for older adults with low vision as an effective approach related to home training. The multicomponent group interventions include learning new knowledge or skills each week, having multiple sessions to allow participants to apply learned knowledge or skills in their living environment, and building relationships with their health care providers. The most important factor in this intervention is support from family, which includes assistance with changes in lifestyles, financial concerns, and future planning.

Occupational Therapy 
Occupational therapists can assess how low vision affects day-to-day function. They can promote independence in daily activities through home assessments and modifications, problem solving training, home exercise programs and finding compensatory strategies. For example, an occupational therapist can suggest adding lighting and contrast to a room to improve visibility.

References 

Visual disturbances and blindness
Vision
Genetic engineering